The Very Best of George Benson: The Greatest Hits of All is a compilation album by American singer and guitarist George Benson, released in 2003 by Warner Bros. Records. The album features some of the greatest hits of Benson's career in ten years of career, recorded between 1976 and 1986. This compilation is an international version of The Greatest Hits of All, released in the United States that same year, however, it is a different album, with other Benson hits that had not been included in the American version. The order of the tracks is random, not chronological. This album includes tracks like "Nothing's Gonna Change My Love for You" (released as a single in Europe in 1985), "In Your Eyes" (success in the United Kingdom and Brazil in 1983), "You Are The Love of My Life" (duet with Roberta Flack) and Benson cover versions for "Feel Like Makin' Love", "Nature Boy" and "Moody's Mood" (duet with Patti Austin).

Track listing
These are "the greatest hits of all" present in this Benson compilation:

Personnel
Information taken from the back cover of the compilation:

Compilation producers:
 George Benson
 Scott Galloway
 David McLees

Songs producers:
 Quincy Jones (tracks 1, 4, 16)
 Jay Graydon (tracks 2, 3)
 Michael Masser (tracks 5, 6, 11)
 Arif Mardin (tracks 7, 10, 12, 14, 15)
 Tommy LiPuma (tracks 8, 9, 17, 18, 20)
 Narada Michael Walden (tracks 13, 19)
 Preston Glass (track 19)

Executive producer:
 Dennis Turner

Sound producer:
 Bill Inglot

Management:
 Turner Management Group, Inc.
 Dennis Turner
 Stephanie Gurevitz-Gonzalez

Charts

Certifications

References

George Benson albums
2003 greatest hits albums
2003 compilation albums
Warner Records compilation albums